NPIS may refer to:

 New Pakistan International School, Hawally, Kuwait; founded in 1997
 National Poisons Information Service, of the United Kingdom
 National Police Immigration Service (Norway)

See also

 
 NPI (disambiguation)